Peter Loves Mary is an American situation comedy starring Peter Lind Hayes and Mary Healy which centers around a show-business couple and their family who move from New York City to the suburbs. Original episodes aired from 12 October 1960 until 31 May 1961.

Synopsis

Peter and Mary Lindsey are a headlining husband-and-wife nightclub act in which he is a corny comic and she is a singer. Mary and the Lindseys′ longtime housekeeper – the upbeat, wisecracking Wilma, who calls Peter "Squire Lindsey" — decide that it would be better for Peter and Mary's 8-year-old daughter Leslie (who without explanation ages into an 11-year-old as the season progresses) and 6-year-old son Steve to grow up in the suburbs rather than in the show-business life of the city. So, after 20 years on the road, the Lindsey family and Wilma move from New York City to 130 Maple Street in Oakdell — or Oakdale, according to some sources — Connecticut.

The move leaves the Lindseys having to juggle the competing demands of show-business life in the city and family life in the suburbs. Mary is the more level-headed and confident of the two, and her dream is to live the complete suburban lifestyle that she has read about in magazines of book clubs, the Garden Club of America, the parent–teacher association, local government, and working for social causes. Peter, who tends to be vain and paranoid, goes along with the move out of his love for Mary, but makes it reluctantly; he dislikes commuting and misses city life and socializing with their show-business friends in Manhattan. Peter still craves the spotlight and performs occasionally at the Imperial Room in Manhattan as well as for their suburban friends at parties Mary throws each week, but he also makes forays into suburban activities, serving as president of the Keep Oakdell (Oakdale) Beautiful Committee and chairman of the board of the High School Project, which seeks to finance the building of the town's first high school. Adding to the complexity – and often the chaos – of the Lindseys' move are visits from Mary's parents, the Gibneys, and the family's interactions with their neighbors and with Gladys, a sour housekeeper who works next door and is friends with Wilma.

Production
In real life Peter Lind Hayes and Mary Healy were a married show-business couple who performed together for over 40 years and were famous at the time Peter Loves Mary premiered in 1960 for their work in radio, movies, and television. Also in real life, they had moved from New York City to the suburbs with their son and daughter and had juggled the demands of show-business life and those of suburban life – for example, broadcasting from their suburban home so that they could stay closer to their children – so Peter Loves Mary was semi-autobiographical for them. On television, they previously had starred together in The Peter Lind Hayes Show in 1950–1951, which had a format similar to that of Peter Loves Mary, although the earlier show had also included musical interludes.

Danny Simon created the format for Peter Loves Mary and developed it with Walter Mirisch. Billy Friedburg produced the show, and Buddy Bregman wrote the music for it.

Cast
Peter Lind Hayes....Peter Lindsey
Mary Healy....Mary Lindsey
Bea Benaderet....Wilma
Merry Martin...Leslie Lindsey
Gil Smith...Steve Lindsey
Alan Reed....Happy Richman
Howard Smith...Horace Gibney
Arch Johnson....Charlie

Broadcast history

Peter Loves Mary premiered on October 12, 1960, and aired on Wednesdays at 10:00 p.m. throughout its run. It was canceled after a single season and its last episode aired on May 31, 1961.

Episodes
Sources

References

External links
Peter Loves Mary opening credits on YouTube
Scene from Peter Loves Mary on YouTube

NBC original programming
1960s American sitcoms
1960 American television series debuts
1961 American television series endings
Television shows set in Connecticut